The 1914 Northwestern Purple team represented Northwestern University during the 1914 college football season. In their first year under head coach Fred J. Murphy, the Purple compiled a 1–6 record (0–6 against Western Conference opponents) and finished in last place in the Western Conference.

Schedule

References

Northwestern
Northwestern Wildcats football seasons
Northwestern Purple football